Atlanta Memorial Park is a public park in the Buckhead district of Atlanta, Georgia. The approximately  park lies adjacent to Peachtree Creek, a tributary of the Chattahoochee River. The park is a memorial to those who died in the Battle of Peachtree Creek, which took place on parts of this park and nearby Tanyard Creek Park.

History 
The park's location along Peachtree Creek had been the site of the Battle of Peachtree Creek, a major battle in the Atlanta Campaign of the American Civil War. In 1929, former Georgia Governor M. Hoke Smith and others donated the land to the city of Atlanta for the purposes of creating a park. An adjoining golf course, named after Bobby Jones, was built in 1931, while construction on the park began in 1933. The park's location on the creek's floodplain makes it susceptible to occasional flooding.

In 2011, the Atlanta Memorial Park Conservancy was founded to manage the park, and in 2014 it hosted a massive cleanup that removed over 2 tons of litter from the park and creek. Between 2017 and 2019, the park saw several renovations, including the installation of a new playground, improvements to the park's sewage system, the creation of a nature trail, and new sidewalks.

References

Bibliography

External links 
 

Parks in Atlanta
Protected areas established in 1933